Yurivka Raion was a raion (district) of Dnipropetrovsk Oblast, southeastern-central Ukraine. Its administrative centre was located at the urban-type settlement of Yurivka. The raion was abolished on 18 July 2020 as part of the administrative reform of Ukraine, which reduced the number of raions of Dnipropetrovsk Oblast to seven. The area of Yurivka Raion was merged into Pavlohrad Raion.

At the time of disestablishment, the raion consisted of one hromada, Yurivka settlement hromada with the administration in Yurivka.

References

Former raions of Dnipropetrovsk Oblast
1991 establishments in Ukraine
Ukrainian raions abolished during the 2020 administrative reform